The Nayakas of Kalahasti were a line  of rulers of Kalahasti and Vandavasi principalities. Members of the group include Damarla Chennapa Nayaka, after whom the city of Chennai is named. These Nayakas served as vassals of the late Vijayanagara Empire, then held by the Aravidu Dynasty and headquartered at Chandragiri and Vellore.

Notable rulers

Damarla Chennappa Nayaka

Chennappa Nayaka was a Nayaka and trusted general under Sriranga Deva Raya. Chennai, the capital of the Indian state of Tamil Nadu, is named in his honor.

Damarla Moodu Venkatappa Nayaka
Also known as Damarla Venkatadri or Venkatappa as he is called in Dutch records, was the son of Damarla Chennapa Nayaka. He was also in-charge of the administration of the Vijayanagara Empire during the reign of Peda Venkata Raya, and was the Nayaka of Kalahasti and directly controlled the region up to Wandiwash.

The land grant for the city of Madras was offered to the British by him and his brother, when they negotiated on behalf of Peda Venkata Raya of Vijayanagara Empire.

Damarla Ayyappa Nayaka
Damarla Ayyappa Nayaka was the brother of Damarla Venkatappa Nayaka and resided at Poonamallee to the west of Madras and administered the territory of Kalahasti for his brother.

Damarla Ankabhupala Nayaka
Damarla  Ankabhupala Nayaka was younger brother of Damarla Venkatappa Nayaka and Damarla Ayyappa Nayaka   Damarla Ankabhupala Nayaka was son of Damarla Chennapa Nayaka. He was Chief of Kalahasti. Ankabhugala was a well-known Writer In the Telugu literature Ankabhupala known by a Telugu Poem, Ushaparinayam which he wrote and dedicated to his father, Chennappa Nayaka  and Ankabhupala  has a single kanda verse (16 ganas with 64 matras) from which one can obtain 108 verses in the metre by shortening or elongating the vowels and changing the sequence of the word 
Damarla  Ankabhupala  was Royal Telugu poet

Damarla Timmappa Nayaka
Damarla Timmappa Nayaka  son of Damarla Chennapa Nayaka. He was the Chief of Kalahasti.

Damarla Chenna Venkata
Damarla Chenna Venkata was the son of Damarla Chennappa Nayaka. Chenna Venkata was a poet. He wrote the Telugu poem Chitra Kavita.

Second Mysore Wars
During the Second Mysore War, the Nayakas of Kalahasti took to the side of Hyder Ali while their northern superiors Venkatagiri Kings took to the side of Arcot and the British.

Notes

References

Bibliography
 
 
 
 

History of Chennai
Telugu monarchs
Tamil Nadu under the Vijayanagar Empire